David Lubbock Robinson ( – 21 August 1943) was an Irish Fianna Fáil politician and a revolutionary figure in County Wicklow during the Irish War of Independence and the Irish Civil War.

He was born in Dublin in about 1882 to the Very Reverend J.J. Robinson, who was Rector of Delgany and later the Dean of St Anne's Cathedral, Belfast. His grandfather, John Robinson, was the owner of the Daily Express newspaper in Dublin. His mother was the youngest daughter of Sir John W. Lubbock and a sister of the first Lord Avebury, the noted scientist. He was educated at St Columba's College and at Trinity College Dublin and qualified as a solicitor. He was a keen hockey enthusiast and represented Ireland at international level.

After he qualified he travelled to Canada and during World War I he enlisted in the 19th Alberta Dragoons as a private and was commissioned to the Royal Marine Artillery. He had a distinguished military career and was awarded the Distinguished Service Order by the British Government and the Croix de Guerre. He had lost an eye and was badly wounded in both legs during his years at the front. His cousin, Robert Barton, had resigned as a British officer after the 1916 Easter Rising and was elected as a Sinn Féin Teachta Dála at the 1918 general election for the West Wicklow constituency. His other cousin, Erskine Childers, used his yacht, the Asgard, to transport guns from Germany to Ireland on behalf of the Irish Volunteers. He too was a former British Army Officer that became more sympathetic with the cause of Irish independence after the events of the Rising. Robinson took an active part in the War of Independence in Wicklow. He opposed the Anglo-Irish Treaty and fought on the Republican side in the Civil War. He was present in Annamoe, County Wicklow when his cousin, Erskine, was arrested by Free State Troops and taken to Dublin which would result in his court-martial and execution. Robinson was himself arrested in 1922 and spent forty days on hunger strike during his eighteen months' internment in Mountjoy jail.

He was one of seven successful Fianna Fáil candidates who secured election to the Free State Seanad at the 1931 Seanad election, securing a nine-year term. Michael Comyn, the Leas-Chathaoirleach of the Seanad was appointed a Circuit Court Judge on 24 February 1936 and he resigned his seat in the Seanad. Robinson succeeded him as Leas-Chathaoirleach. He remained a member of the Seanad until its abolition in 1936. In 1938 he was nominated by then Taoiseach Éamon de Valera to the newly formed Seanad Éireann. He was nominated again to the 3rd Seanad but did not seek re-election in 1943. He was also the Secretary of the Irish Red Cross when it was inaugurated.

He died at Delgany, County Wicklow aged sixty-one years.

References

1880s births
1943 deaths
Members of the 1931 Seanad
Members of the 1934 Seanad
Members of the 2nd Seanad
Members of the 3rd Seanad
Fianna Fáil senators
Politicians from County Wicklow
Alumni of Trinity College Dublin
Sportspeople from Dublin (city)
Companions of the Distinguished Service Order
Canadian military personnel of World War I
Politicians with disabilities
Irish people with disabilities
Nominated members of Seanad Éireann